The 2012 North Carolina gubernatorial election took place on November 6, 2012, concurrently with the 2012 United States presidential election, U.S. House election, statewide judicial election, Council of State election and various local elections.

The incumbent Democratic governor, Bev Perdue, was eligible to run for reelection, but announced on January 26, 2012, that she would not seek a second term. Incumbent lieutenant governor Walter H. Dalton won the Democratic nomination, while former mayor of Charlotte and 2008 gubernatorial nominee Pat McCrory won the Republican nomination. McCrory won the election with almost 55 percent of the vote to Dalton's 43 percent, the largest margin of victory for a Republican in an open-seat race for governor since the Reconstruction Era. Libertarian nominee Barbara Howe took 2% of the vote. When he was inaugurated as the 74th governor of North Carolina in January 2013, the Republicans held complete control of state government for the first time since Reconstruction. However, this would be the last time a Republican won the governorship of North Carolina.

As of 2022, this is the only time a Republican was elected Governor of North Carolina since 1992. It was also the last time the state concurrently voted for a gubernatorial and presidential candidate of the same party, and the last time a Republican candidate won Mecklenburg County in a statewide election.

Democratic primary

Candidates
 Bruce Blackmon, physician
 Walter H. Dalton, Lieutenant Governor
 Gary M. Dunn, salesman and UNC-Charlotte student
 Bob Etheridge, former U.S. Representative
 Bill Faison, state representative
 Gardenia Henley, retired U.S. Agency for International Development auditor

Declined
 Dan Blue, state senator
 Erskine Bowles, chairman of the National Commission on Fiscal Responsibility and Reform, former UNC System president, former White House Chief of Staff
 Roy Cooper, Attorney General of North Carolina
 Janet Cowell, state treasurer
 Cal Cunningham, former state senator
 Anthony Foxx, mayor of Charlotte
 Kay Hagan, U.S. Senator
 Jim Hunt, former governor
 Allen Joines, Mayor of Winston-Salem
 Mike McIntyre, U.S. Representative
 Brad Miller, U.S. Representative
 Richard H. Moore, former North Carolina State Treasurer and candidate for governor in 2008
 Bev Perdue, incumbent governor
 Heath Shuler, U.S. Representative

Polling

Debates
A series of televised debates between candidates Dalton, Etheridge and Faison, held April 16–18, was considered potentially pivotal, since "the governor’s race has so far attracted little attention, created little buzz and produced few political commercials" and "polls suggest there is still a large swath of Democratic voters who have yet to decide" for whom to vote.
The first debate, conducted by WRAL-TV and broadcast statewide, featured few differences between the candidates, but Faison was seen as the aggressor. The second debate (conducted by UNC-TV) was more contentious, with Dalton criticizing Etheridge's support of a free trade agreement while he was in Congress, and Etheridge attacking Dalton over his attendance record on boards and commissions and his alleged failure to speak out against the actions of the majority-Republican legislature.
In the final debate of the series, this one conducted by WNCN-TV and the North Carolina League of Women Voters, candidates were considered to be more "muted" in their criticisms of each other. All three spoke out strongly against a voter ID bill proposed by Republicans in the state legislature. Dalton emphasized modernizing the state's economy, Etheridge continued his themes of leadership and education, and Faison most sharply attacked Republicans and called for action on the state's unemployment problem.

Results

Republican primary

Candidates
 Jim Harney, businessman
Scott Jones, businessman
Jim Mahan, small businessman and former teacher
 Pat McCrory, former mayor of Charlotte and nominee for governor in 2008
 Charles Kenneth Moss, businessman and preacher
 Paul Wright, attorney and former District Court and Superior Court judge

Declined
 Phil Berger, State Senate President Pro Tem
 Cherie Berry, state labor commissioner (running for re-election)
 Peter Brunstetter, state senator
 Paul Coble, former mayor of Raleigh and current chairman of the Wake County Board of Commissioners (running for Congress)
 Steve Troxler, state Agriculture Commissioner (running for re-election)

Polling

Results

General election

Candidates

 Walter H. Dalton (D), lieutenant governor
 Barbara Howe (L), nominee for governor in 2000 and 2004
 Pat McCrory (R), former mayor of Charlotte and nominee for governor in 2008

Predictions

Debates
Complete video of debate, October 3, 2012 - C-SPAN
Complete video of debate, October 16, 2012 - C-SPAN
Complete video of debate, October 24, 2012 - C-SPAN

Dalton and McCrory met for their first televised debate at the studios of UNC-TV on October 3, 2012. Two debates were sponsored by the North Carolina Association of Broadcasters Educational Foundation, with the third and final debate sponsored by WRAL-TV and the Rocky Mount Chamber of Commerce. Howe was not invited to participate in any of the scheduled debates. The Associated Press characterized Dalton as going "on the offensive" against McCrory in the first debate. The final encounter between the two candidates, held Oct. 24 on the campus of North Carolina Wesleyan College, featured "more subdued disagreements over taxes, education, health care and mental health."

Polling

Democratic primary polling with Perdue

Republican primary with Ellmers, Troxler

General election polling
With Blue

With Blackmon

With Bowles

With Cooper

With Foxx

With Etheridge

With Faison

With Henley

With Hagan

With Joines

With McIntyre

With Meeker

With Miller

With Moore

With Perdue

With Shuler

Results

See also
 2012 North Carolina lieutenant gubernatorial election
 2012 United States gubernatorial elections

References

External links
 North Carolina State Board of Elections

Official campaign websites
 Walter Dalton for Governor
 Barbara Howe for Governor
 Pat McCrory for Governor

North Carolina
2012
Governor